The 2016–17 OHL season was the 37th season of the Ontario Hockey League, in which twenty teams played 68 games each according to the regular season schedule, from September 21, 2016 to March 21, 2017. The playoffs began on March 23, 2017 and ended on May 12. The Erie Otters won the J. Ross Robertson Cup for the second time in franchise history, and the first time since 2002, as they defeated the Mississauga Steelheads in five games to represent the OHL at the 2017 Memorial Cup held at the WFCU Centre in Windsor, Ontario. The Windsor Spitfires also qualified for the tournament as the host team.

Regular season

Final standings
Note: DIV = Division; GP = Games played; W = Wins; L = Losses; OTL = Overtime losses; SL = Shootout losses; GF = Goals for; GA = Goals against; PTS = Points; x = clinched playoff berth; y = clinched division title; z = clinched conference title

Eastern conference

Western conference

Scoring leaders
Note: GP = Games played; G = Goals; A = Assists; Pts = Points; PIM = Penalty minutes

Leading goaltenders
Note: GP = Games played; Mins = Minutes played; W = Wins; L = Losses: OTL = Overtime losses; SL = Shootout losses; GA = Goals Allowed; SO = Shutouts; GAA = Goals against average

Playoffs

Conference quarterfinals

Eastern conference quarterfinals

(1) Peterborough Petes vs. (8) Niagara IceDogs

(2) Mississauga Steelheads vs. (7) Ottawa 67's

(3) Oshawa Generals vs. (6) Sudbury Wolves

(4) Kingston Frontenacs vs. (5) Hamilton Bulldogs

Western conference quarterfinals

(1) Erie Otters vs. (8) Sarnia Sting

(2) Sault Ste. Marie Greyhounds vs. (7) Flint Firebirds

(3) Owen Sound Attack vs. (6) Kitchener Rangers

(4) London Knights vs. (5) Windsor Spitfires

Conference semifinals

Eastern conference semifinals

(1) Peterborough Petes vs. (4) Kingston Frontenacs

(2) Mississauga Steelheads vs. (3) Oshawa Generals

Western conference semifinals

(1) Erie Otters vs. (4) London Knights

(2) Sault Ste. Marie Greyhounds vs. (3) Owen Sound Attack

Conference finals

Eastern conference finals

(1) Peterborough Petes vs. (2) Mississauga Steelheads

Western conference finals

(1) Erie Otters vs. (3) Owen Sound Attack

J. Ross Robertson Cup

(W1) Erie Otters vs. (E2) Mississauga Steelheads

J. Ross Robertson Cup Champions Roster

Playoff scoring leaders
Note: GP = Games played; G = Goals; A = Assists; Pts = Points; PIM = Penalty minutes

Playoff leading goaltenders

Note: GP = Games played; Mins = Minutes played; W = Wins; L = Losses: OTL = Overtime losses; SL = Shootout losses; GA = Goals Allowed; SO = Shutouts; GAA = Goals against average

Awards

All-Star teams
The OHL All-Star Teams were selected by the OHL's General Managers.

First team
Dylan Strome, Centre, Erie Otters
Adam Mascherin, Left Wing, Kitchener Rangers
Alex DeBrincat, Right Wing, Erie Otters
Santino Centorame, Defence, Owen Sound Attack
Darren Raddysh, Defence, Erie Otters
Michael McNiven, Goaltender, Owen Sound Attack
Ryan McGill, Coach, Owen Sound Attack

Second team
Nick Suzuki, Centre, Owen Sound Attack
Petrus Palmu, Right Wing, Owen Sound Attack
Ryan Mantha, Defence, Niagara IceDogs
Mikhail Sergachev, Defence, Windsor Spitfires
Tyler Parsons, Goaltender, London Knights
Kris Knoblauch, Coach, Erie Otters

Third team
Cliff Pu, Centre, London Knights
Kevin Hancock, Left Wing, Owen Sound Attack
Taylor Raddysh, Right Wing, Erie Otters
Filip Hronek, Defence, Saginaw Spirit
Olli Juolevi, Defence, London Knights
Michael DiPietro, Goaltender, Windsor Spitfires
Drew Bannister, Coach, Sault Ste. Marie Greyhounds

2017 OHL Priority Selection
On April 8, 2017, the OHL conducted the 2017 Ontario Hockey League Priority Selection. The Barrie Colts held the first overall pick in the draft, and selected Ryan Suzuki from the London Jr. Knights of the MHAO. Suzuki was awarded the Jack Ferguson Award, awarded to the top pick in the draft.

Below are the players who were selected in the first round of the 2017 Ontario Hockey League Priority Selection.

2017 NHL Entry Draft
On June 23-24, 2017, the National Hockey League conducted the 2017 NHL Entry Draft held at the United Center in Chicago, Illinois. In total, 42 players from the Ontario Hockey League were selected in the draft. Owen Tippett of the Mississauga Steelheads was the first player from the OHL to be selected, as he was taken with the tenth overall pick by the Florida Panthers.

Below are the players selected from OHL teams at the NHL Entry Draft.

2017 CHL Import Draft
On June 28, 2017, the Canadian Hockey League conducted the 2017 CHL Import Draft, in which teams in all three CHL leagues participate in. The Barrie Colts held the first pick in the draft by a team in the OHL, and selected Andrei Svechnikov from Russia with their selection.

Below are the players who were selected in the first round by Ontario Hockey League teams in the 2017 CHL Import Draft.

References

Ontario Hockey League seasons
Ohl